Canyelles is a town in the northeast of the Garraf comarca (county) in the south of Barcelona province, Catalonia, Spain. It is home to a 15th-century castle.

Culture
Main festivals include:

Xatonada Popular 
Festa Major de Canyelles (July 22)
Petita Festa Major (September 10)
Fira de Santa Llúcia (1st Sunday in December)

References

External links 
Official site (in Catalan)
Historic and artistical buildings (in Catalan)
 Government data pages 

Municipalities in Garraf